The Douglas Avenue School, at 900 Douglas Ave. in Las Vegas, New Mexico was built in 1928.  It was listed on the National Register of Historic Places in 1983.

It is a two-story, Spanish Colonial Revival-style building with a T-shaped plan.  It was "an early, important work" of architect John Gaw Meem, who worked at the time with business partner Cassius McCormick.

References

National Register of Historic Places in San Miguel County, New Mexico
Buildings and structures completed in 1928